Alfonso Parera (19 September 1922 – 28 June 1996) was a Cuban weightlifter. He competed in the men's heavyweight event at the 1948 Summer Olympics.

References

1922 births
1996 deaths
Cuban male weightlifters
Olympic weightlifters of Cuba
Weightlifters at the 1948 Summer Olympics
Place of birth missing
20th-century Cuban people